The Clarenceville station was on the Atlantic Branch of the Long Island Rail Road, located on Atlantic Avenue west of 111th Street in the Richmond Hill section of Queens, New York City. Richmond Hill station to the north, at Jamaica Avenue and Lefferts Boulevard, was also originally named Clarenceville Station when it opened in 1868, but that name was changed in 1871.

Clarenceville was originally an 1874-built Atlantic Avenue Rapid Transit station that was reopened as an LIRR station in 1905 as part of the LIRR's electrification of the Atlantic Branch, and closed in 1939, when the branch was moved underground, along with Warwick Street, Autumn Avenue, Union Course, Woodhaven, Morris Park, and Dunton stations.

References

External links
1905 Atlantic Branch Electrification; Woodhaven Junction to Rockaway Junction (Arrt's Arrchives)
Site of former Clarenceville LIRR station (Road and Rail Pictures)

Former Long Island Rail Road stations in New York City
Railway stations in the United States opened in 1874
Railway stations closed in 1939
Railway stations in Queens, New York
1874 establishments in New York (state)
1939 disestablishments in New York (state)